Water, Wind, Dust is a 1989 film by the Iranian director Amir Naderi. It is often seen as a companion piece to the director's earlier film The Runner, and stars the same lead actor Madjid Niroumand. Both films also won the Montgolfière d'Or prize at the Three Continents Festival.

Water, Wind, Dust is regarded as one of Naderi's finest films. The filmmaker Sean Baker described it (and The Runner) as having a major influence on his 2017 feature The Florida Project.

References

Iranian drama films
1980s Persian-language films
1989 films
Films directed by Amir Naderi